Todd Smola, a Republican member of the Massachusetts House of Representatives
 Josef von Smola (1764–1820), officer
 Josef von Smola (1805–1856) Austrian officer
 Michal Smola, a Czech orienteering competitor
 Smøla, municipality in Møre og Romsdal county, Norway
 Smøla, an island in Norway
Occupational surnames
Surnames from nicknames